Maurice Morgan Moulder (November 28, 1900 – November 6, 1983) was an American football coach. He served as the head football coach at Arizona State Teachers College at Flagstaff—now known as Northern Arizona University—from 1940 to 1942 and the New Mexico College of Agriculture and Mechanic Arts—now known as New Mexico State University—in 1943, compiling a career college football record of 10–16.

Coaching career
From 1940 to 1942, he coached at Arizona State Teachers, where he compiled a 6–16 record. In 1943, he coached at New Mexico A&M, where he compiled a 4–0 record.

Head coaching record

College

References

External links
 

1900 births
1983 deaths
Missouri Tigers football players
New Mexico State Aggies football coaches
Northern Arizona Lumberjacks football coaches
College track and field coaches in the United States
Junior college men's basketball coaches in the United States
Junior college football coaches in the United States
Sportspeople from Kansas City, Missouri
Players of American football from Kansas City, Missouri